Frelinghuysen Township School District is a community public school district that serves students in pre-kindergarten through sixth grade from Frelinghuysen Township, Warren County, New Jersey, United States.

As of the 2018–19 school year, the district, comprising one school, had an enrollment of 148 students and 10.7 classroom teachers (on an FTE basis), for a student–teacher ratio of 13.9:1. In the 2016–17 school year, Frelinghuysen had the 28th smallest enrollment of any school district in the state, with 150 students.

The district is classified by the New Jersey Department of Education as being in District Factor Group "GH", the third-highest of eight groupings. District Factor Groups organize districts statewide to allow comparison by common socioeconomic characteristics of the local districts. From lowest socioeconomic status to highest, the categories are A, B, CD, DE, FG, GH, I and J.

Students in seventh through twelfth grades for public school attend the North Warren Regional High School, a public secondary high school that also serves students from the townships of Blairstown (site of the school), Hardwick and Knowlton. As of the 2018–19 school year, the high school had an enrollment of 799 students and 77.6 classroom teachers (on an FTE basis), for a student–teacher ratio of 10.3:1.

History
The township's students had been educated at Johnsonburg School from 1917 to 1956. The current school building opened in September 1956, after which the original Johnsonburg School was repurposed for use as the municipal offices for Frelinghuysen Township.

Schools
Frelinghuysen Elementary School served 148 students in grades PreK-6 in the 2018–19 school year.

Administration
Core members of the district's administration are:
Stephanie Bonaparte, Superintendent
Karin Laraway, Interim Business Administrator / Board Secretary

Board of education
The district's board of education, comprised of nine members, sets policy and oversees the fiscal and educational operation of the district through its administration. As a Type II school district, the board's trustees are elected directly by voters to serve three-year terms of office on a staggered basis, with three seats up for election each year held (since 2012) as part of the November general election. The board appoints a superintendent to oversee the district's day-to-day operations and a business administrator to supervise the business functions of the district.

References

External links
Frelinghuysen Township School

School Data for the Frelinghuysen Township School, National Center for Education Statistics
North Warren Regional School District

School Data for the North Warren Regional High School, National Center for Education Statistics

Frelinghuysen Township, New Jersey
New Jersey District Factor Group GH
School districts in Warren County, New Jersey
Public elementary schools in New Jersey